The ravine salamander (Plethodon richmondi) is a species of salamander in the family Plethodontidae. The species is endemic to the United States, and it is threatened by habitat loss.

Etymology
The epithet, richmondi, is in honor of its discoverer, Neil D. Richmond, who later succeeded M. Graham Netting as Curator of the Section of Amphibians and Reptiles at the Carnegie Museum of Natural History, Pittsburgh, Pennsylvania.

Description
An adult ravine salamander is 7.5–11.5 cm (3–4½ inches) in total length (including tail). It has short limbs and is somewhat worm-like in appearance and movement. Dorsally and laterally, it is dark brown or black, with silvery or brassy flecks. Ventrally, unlike other small plethodontids, it is dark brown or black.

Geographic range
The ravine salamander is found in eastern Kentucky, Ohio, southern West Virginia, western Virginia, northwestern North Carolina, northeastern Tennessee, and southwestern Pennsylvania.

Habitat and behavior
The natural habitat of P. richmondi is temperate forests, in which it prefers the slopes of valleys and ravines. It is a terrestrial species and is found among the leaf litter, hiding under logs, stones or stumps. It hibernates underground in winter and aestivates at the height of summer.

Reproduction
Eggs of P. richmondi are laid in cracks and crevices and develop directly into juvenile salamanders without an intervening larval stage.

Conservation status
The main threats facing the ravine salamander are degradation of its habitat, and some sub-populations have been destroyed by this. However, it is a common species in its wide geographic range and occurs in several protected areas, and overall the population seems steady. For these reasons, the International Union for Conservation of Nature has assessed it as being of "least concern".

References

Further reading

Behler, John L., and F. Wayne King (1979). The Audubon Society Field Guide to North American Reptiles and Amphibians. New York: Alfred A. Knopf. 743 pp. . (Plethodon richmondi, pp. 346–347 + Plate 72).
Netting, M. Graham, and M.B. Mittleman (1938). "Description of Plethodon richmondi, a new salamander from West Virginia and Ohio". Annals of the Carnegie Museum 27: 287–293.
Powell, Robert, Roger Conant and Joseph T. Collins (2016). Peterson Field Guide to Reptiles and Amphibians of Eastern and Central North America, Fourth Edition. Boston and New York: Houghton Mifflin Harcourt. xiv + 494 pp., 207 figures, 47 plates. . (Plethodon richmondi, pp. 80–81, Figure 37 + Plate 6).

Amphibians of the United States
Plethodon
Taxonomy articles created by Polbot
Amphibians described in 1938
Taxa named by M. Graham Netting